Francis Kotz Farm, also known as The Kotz Place, is a historic home located near Wardensville, Hardy County, West Virginia. The house was built about 1860, and is a two-story, four-room Greek Revival style brick house, with side gable roof.  A two-story addition was built about 1875.  The house sits on a stone foundation.  Also on the property is a three-story frame building built as the original Kotz family home in the 1850s.  It also housed a wood-working shop.  The contributing barn was built about 1865.

It was listed on the National Register of Historic Places in 2008.

References

Farms on the National Register of Historic Places in West Virginia
Houses on the National Register of Historic Places in West Virginia
Houses in Hardy County, West Virginia
Greek Revival houses in West Virginia
Houses completed in 1860
National Register of Historic Places in Hardy County, West Virginia
1860 establishments in Virginia